David Ian Crown (born 16 February 1958) is an English retired professional footballer who played as a forward in the Football League, most notably for Cambridge United and Southend United. He also played for Reading, Gillingham, Brentford, Portsmouth and Exeter City. Until March 2021, Crown's 24 goals in a Football League season stood as Cambridge United's club record. He later player-managed Purfleet in non-League football and served as assistant manager at Concord Rangers and Southend United.

Personal life 
As of October 2000, Crown was running an accountancy firm in Leigh-on-Sea. As of February 2020, he was working as a matchday host at former club Southend United.

Career statistics

Honours 
Southend United

 Football League Fourth Division third-place promotion: 1989–90

Individual
PFA Football League Fourth Division Team of the Year: 1989–90
 Southend United Player of the Year: 1988–89

References

External links
Official website

1958 births
Living people
English footballers
Grays Athletic F.C. players
Walthamstow Avenue F.C. players
Brentford F.C. players
Portsmouth F.C. players
Exeter City F.C. players
Reading F.C. players
Cambridge United F.C. players
Southend United F.C. players
Gillingham F.C. players
Dagenham & Redbridge F.C. players
Thurrock F.C. players
Aylesbury United F.C. players
Sudbury Town F.C. players
Billericay Town F.C. players
Concord Rangers F.C. players
English Football League players
Footballers from Enfield, London
English accountants
Thurrock F.C. managers
National League (English football) players
Southend United F.C. non-playing staff
Isthmian League managers
Isthmian League players
Association football forwards
Association football wingers
English football managers